Ruben Katsobashvili (born February 20, 1933) is a Russian businessman who is a member of the board of directors of Interactive Energy AG, a company specialising in commodity trading (Energy, Metals & Minerals, Soft Commodities). He currently lives in Moscow.

Early life 

Katsobashvili was born in February 1933 in Georgia to a Jewish family. He is the son of Samuel, a Russian by ethnicity, who was a Dentist, and Sara, an Italian. His family lived in Russia. Katsobashvili has always been known for having expertise in Chess and has won many prices in Russia. He graduated with a Bachelor's degree in Economy & Government National Economy from Tbilisi University. He has also done PhD in Computer Science from the University of Moscow. The languages he knows are Russian, Georgian.

Career 

Katsobashvili has spent around 30 years in the Energy sector  in Georgia and Russia. In some of the sectors, he is considered to be a veteran. Strategic planning, implementation guiding and even overseeing the firms through substantial change management in which effective strategic leadership is applied. He has also proved himself in rekindling abortive businesses.

He is known for efficiently playing his role as the CEO of Nefti Saqartvelo, a company providing energy-related services, specializing in transportation and logistics and with the turnover of $4 billion. He shared his ideas and worked hard for the development of the company’s strategy, implementing short and long term plans while ensuring that the effective internal controls and information management systems were in place.

Apart from these, he is also the founder of RUB oil and Gas consulting, a private consulting company which was bought by Olaf & MarcKlarenco in 2010. He came up with management and leadership while executing strategic plan, where he analyzed, reviewed, and recommended acquisition opportunities with an aim to accelerate growth of the clients. While being on the energy sector, he also worked as a private advisor for the partners and customers who were involved in dealing into oil and gas. He advised them to meet their performance investment objectives, increasing profits, market shares and return on investment.

Ventures 

 The Interactive Energy AG, a company that basically deals into energy and commodity; whereas, the core of the business lies into logistics, physical trading and distribution. They take the physical commodities from the third party producers and distribute those accordingly. Ruben Katsobashvili completely finances this project and is one of the driving forces behind the establishment of this company. His effective strategic leadership skill has helped him in growing the company in a short period.
 He found RUB oil and gas consulting. It was a private consulting firm which was later sold to Olaf & MarcKlarenco in 2010.

Business career 
 Nefti Sakartvelo Ltd., Tbilisi, F.S.U. (Georgia) (1987 - 1991): CEO of the company.
 RUB Oil and Gas Consulting (1992 - 2010): Founder of the company.
 Private Advisor to Previous Partners and Customers (2010 – Till date): Keeping in touch with the clients to understand their requirements, coming up with financial plans, implementing approved plans, etc.
 Private Businessman (1992 - 2010)
 R.K.A. Igravil, Moscow (2000 - 2006): Took care of the operational and strategic activities
 Maraka Development and Investment Ltd. (1994 – 2013)

References 

1933 births
Living people
Russian energy industry businesspeople